State Route 62 (SR 62) is a  state highway in the southwestern part of the U.S. state of Georgia. It connects Columbia, Alabama with Albany.

Route description
SR 62 begins at the Alabama state line, where the highway continues as Alabama State Route 52 into Columbia. SR 62 travels in a northeasterly direction, through rural areas of Early County, toward Blakely. About  after starting, it intersects the northern terminus of SR 370 near Hilton. Just after entering Blakely, SR 62 has an intersection with SR 62 Bypass before going to downtown Blakely. While in downtown, it has an intersection with US 27 Business/SR 1 Business/SR 39 (South Main Street). The four routes head concurrent around the city square. A little farther to the east is the western terminus of SR 200 (Damascus Road). Then, SR 62 intersects US 27/SR 1. It continues to the northeast and has a second intersection with SR 62 Bypass. Just before leaving Blakely, it passes the Early County Airport. It heads east and east-northeast through rural portions of the county. Just before it leaves the county, it enters Arlington. In town, it begins a concurrency with SR 45/SR 216 (Highland Avenue South) and heads north into Calhoun County. Once in the Calhoun County portion of town, SR 62 departs its concurrency with SR 45/SR 216 (Highland Avenue North). The route continues in an east-northeast direction through rural portions of Calhoun County, and enters the town of Leary. In Leary, the route has an intersection with SR 37 (Depot Street). This intersection also marks the southern terminus of SR 55 (Mercer Avenue). SR 37/SR 62 have a very brief concurrency before SR 62 departs to the east. A short distance later, it crosses over Chickasawhatchee Creek into Dougherty County, going through the town of Pretoria, before reaching SR 91. The two highways head concurrent to the northeast and enter Albany. In Albany, they pass the Southwest Georgia Regional Airport. Just past the airport, SR 62 splits off to the north for a brief distance before reaching its eastern terminus, an intersection with SR 234.

The entire length of SR 1 is part of the National Highway System, a system of routes determined to be the most important for the nation's economy, mobility, and defense.

Major intersections

Special routes

Blakely bypass route

State Route 62 Bypass (SR 62 Byp.) is a  bypass route that exists entirely within the northern part of the town of Blakely.

It begins at an intersection with the SR 62 mainline (Columbia Road) in the western part of town. It heads north and curves to the east, to an intersection with SR 39. The two routes head concurrent to the east. At an intersection with US 27 Business/SR 1 Business (North Main Street), SR 39 departs the concurrency to the south, while SR 62 Bypass continues to the east. A little farther, it intersects US 27/SR 1. The highway heads northeast and curves to the southeast, until it meets is eastern terminus, a second intersection with the SR 62 mainline in the eastern part of town.

The entire length of SR 62 Byp. is part of the National Highway System, a system of routes determined to be the most important for the nation's economy, mobility, and defense.

Arlington truck route

State Route 62 Truck (SR 62 Truck) is a  truck route of SR 62 that exists in the southwestern part of Calhoun County. Its entire length is within the city limits of Arlington. It is entirely concurrent with SR 45 Alt., SR 45 Truck, and SR 216 Truck. It is also signed as the Charlie and Mary Cowart Bypass.

SR 45 Alt. and the three truck routes begin at an intersection with SR 45/SR 62/SR 216 (Highland Avenue) in the central part of Arlington. They travel to the east-northeast on Cedar Street for two blocks. At Mayhaw Avenue, they turn left and travel north-northwest for one block. At an intersection with SR 62 (Pioneer Road), SR 62 Truck ends, SR 216 Truck turns left onto SR 62, and SR 45 Alt. and SR 45 Truck continue along Mayhaw Avenue.

See also

References

External links
 

 Georgia Roads (Routes 61 - 80)

062
Transportation in Early County, Georgia
Transportation in Calhoun County, Georgia
Transportation in Dougherty County, Georgia